The  is a commuter electric multiple unit (EMU) train type operated by the private railway operator Hanshin Electric Railway in Japan since August 2015.

Design
The trains feature passenger-operated door buttons, unusual in the Kansai region.

Formation
, one four-car set is in service. Trains are formed as four-car sets, as shown below, with all cars motored, although only one bogie on each of the end cars is motored.

The M1 car has two single-arm pantographs, and the M2 car has one.

Interior
Passenger accommodation consists of longitudinal bench seating throughout, with blue moquette seat covers. LED lighting is used in the interiors, and 32-inch half-height LCD passenger information screens are provided above three out of six doorways per car, with information provided in four languages: Japanese, English, Chinese, and Korean.

History
Details of the new trains were officially announced in March 2015. The first set delivered, 5701, entered revenue service from 24 August 2015.

In May 2016, the 5700 series was awarded the 2016 Blue Ribbon Award, presented annually by the Japan Railfan Club. A presentation ceremony was held at Koshien Station on 2 October 2016.

A second set was delivered from Kinki Sharyo in March 2017.

Fleet/build details
The individual build histories for the fleet are as follows.

References

External links

 Official news release 

Electric multiple units of Japan
5700 series
Kinki Sharyo multiple units
Train-related introductions in 2015
1500 V DC multiple units of Japan